Villa Incognito is a novel by Tom Robbins published in 2003. This brief work shares the style, humor, and underlying cultural commentary of Robbins' better-known novels. It is recognized as a response to 9/11 and as a commentary on the Vietnam War.

Characters
Villa Incognito begins with the story of Tanuki, an ancient Japanese badger-like creature who possesses the ability to shapeshift and a penchant for sake and women. Tanuki is a "semi-god" with an unusually large scrotum and is portrayed alongside a beautiful young female character, who continues Tanuki's lineage with the use of a chrysanthemum seed embedded in the roof of her mouth, three American MIAs who deliberately remain in Laos long after US involvement in the Vietnam War has ended, and two sisters, who are related to one of the missing American soldiers.

Plot
The novel is set in the present day. Its title refers to a house in Laos inhabited by three American Air Force pilots who have been missing since the Vietnam War.  Following the arrest of one of the MIAs, for trafficking drugs while dressed as a priest, the novel depicts American life in a post-9/11 context through the involvement of the two sisters.

Reception 
The novel received generally favorable reviews in major outlets.  In Publishers Weekly, despite criticism of a "weak ending" the book is called a "delectable farce" that is "true to the mark." The Chicago Tribune review terms it a "baffling but wonderful ride."

References

2003 American novels
Novels by Tom Robbins
Novels set in Thailand
Novels set in Seattle
Novels set in San Francisco